The Bridgeport Harbor Light, later the Bridgeport Harbor Lighthouse, was a lighthouse in Bridgeport, Connecticut, United States. It is located on the west side of the Bridgeport Harbor entrance and the north side of Long Island Sound. Originally constructed in 1851 and rebuilt in 1871 with a dwelling, it had a red-fixed light throughout its service life. The builder and first keeper of the light was Abraham A. McNeil who is also credited as improvising the first light for the Bridgeport Harbor in 1844. By 1953, the lighthouse was in poor condition and the United States Coast Guard opted to build a skeleton tower in its place. The lighthouse was sold and an attempt was made to move it to serve as a monument for Connecticut's maritime history, but it was later decided to scrap the structure. The lighthouse caught fire and was destroyed during the dismantling in 1953.

1851 light 
According to Waldos History of Bridgeport and Vicinity, Volume 1, Abraham A. McNeil first set a light atop a mast to mark the Bridgeport Harbor in 1844. The next day Captain John Brooks Jr. set up his own improvised light with another boat.  Constructed in 1851, the first Bridgeport Harbor Light was an octagonal tower on a box-like structure stood on iron piles. The exact details of its construction are not recorded and there is no complete description, but it is known to have had a fixed red light. Waldo identifies Abraham A. McNeil as the builder of the light. The light had no keeper's quarters and was only accessible by boat. By 1870, a new lighthouse was needed, partly because of the increased maritime traffic.

1871 lighthouse 

Completed in 1871, the rebuilt light had a dwelling with the attached tower containing a fourth-order Fresnel lens. It retained the original fixed red light, but also included a fog bell. In 1900, the lighthouse was identified in the Light List as having a red screw-pile structure, a white tower and dwelling with a slate-gray Mansard roof topped with a black lantern. The lighthouse had a fog signal that sounded every 15 seconds and was operated by machinery.

In 1873, a request for $5,500,  was submitted to Congress for the "additional protection" of the "screw-pile light house". During the first session of the 43rd Congress, the $5,500 was appropriated for the lighthouse. In 1898, during the Spanish–American War the lighthouse was equipped with 10-inch guns to ward off enemy attacks, making it one of the few armed American lighthouses in history. These guns never saw action as there was no attack on the coast. In 1920, $5925 was estimated to be needed for riprap protection.

By 1953, the lighthouse was in poor condition and the U.S. Coast Guard opted to replace it with a skeleton tower. The lighthouse was sold to the Fairfield Dock Company, which initially planned to move it ashore, but it was later decided to dismantle and scrap it. A plan existed to move the lighthouse ashore to a city park as a monument to Connecticut's maritime heritage, but the location could not be agreed upon.

Skeleton tower 
The skeleton tower constructed from 1953 continues to serve Bridgeport Harbor.

List of keepers

See also

 List of lighthouses in the United States
 List of lighthouses in Connecticut
 History of Bridgeport, Connecticut
 Tongue Point Light marks the western side between the inner and outer harbor areas of Bridgeport Harbor.
 Black Rock Harbor Light marks the entrance to the Black Rock Harbor just to the west of Bridgeport Harbor.

Notes

 Page 166 of The Field Guide to Lighthouses of the New England Coast: 150 Destinations in Maine, Massachusetts, Rhode Island, Connecticut misidentifies a photo of the Tongue Point Light as the Bridgeport Harbor Light.

References

External links

  
 Picture of the third Light
 Picture of the current Light

Lighthouses completed in 1851
Lighthouses completed in 1871
Lighthouses in Fairfield County, Connecticut
Buildings and structures in Bridgeport, Connecticut
1851 establishments in Connecticut
Transportation in Bridgeport, Connecticut